Fesere is one of the principal Tewa Pueblo ancestral sites in New Mexico, US. The prehistoric pueblo is situated on a mesa west or south of the Rio Chama, near Abiquiu, Rio Arriba County.

References

Pueblo great houses
Archaeological sites in New Mexico
Puebloan buildings and structures
Native American history of New Mexico
Ruins in the United States
Former populated places in New Mexico
Tewa
Geography of Rio Arriba County, New Mexico
Pueblos in New Mexico